"Goodbye" is a song by English/Australian soft rock duo Air Supply, from their twelfth album The Vanishing Race. Released as a single in 1993, it was an Adult Contemporary chart hit, peaking at No. 48. In the UK, the song peaked at No. 66. The song was more successful in Asia, particularly in the Philippines and Indonesia.

Charts

Cover versions
"Goodbye" has been covered by several artists:
Padhyangan, 1993 (as Good Bye Ayu)
Warren Wiebe, 1994
Jessica Folcker, 1998
René Froger, 2002
Janice Vidal, 2005
Yasmien Kurdi, 2007
Kim Tae-woo, 2013
Brenan Espartinez and Suy Galvez, 2015

References

External links
 

1993 songs
1993 singles
Air Supply songs
Songs written by David Foster
Songs written by Linda Thompson (actress)
Giant Records (Warner) singles
Rock ballads